Andrii Derevinskyi (born 28 March 1988) is a Ukrainian Paralympic swimmer. He represented Ukraine at the 2016 Summer Paralympics and he won two bronze medals: in the men's 50 metre freestyle S4 event and in the mixed 4 x 50 metre freestyle relay 20pts event.

He won six medals at the 2014 IPC Swimming European Championships; three individual medals and three medals in team events.

At the 2018 World Para Swimming European Championships he won the gold medal in the 4 x 50 metres medley relay event.

References

External links 
 

1988 births
Living people
Ukrainian male swimmers
Paralympic swimmers of Ukraine
Paralympic bronze medalists for Ukraine
Swimmers at the 2016 Summer Paralympics
Medalists at the 2016 Summer Paralympics
Place of birth missing (living people)
Paralympic medalists in swimming
S4-classified Paralympic swimmers
21st-century Ukrainian people